Uganda is a country in  East-Central Africa, west of Kenya, east of the Democratic Republic of the Congo.

Uganda or Ugandan may also refer to:

Places
 Uganda (1962–63), an independent sovereign state linked with the British monarchy
 Uganda Protectorate (1894–1962), a protectorate of the British Empire

Transportation and vehicles
 Uganda Airlines, the flag carrier of Uganda from 1977 until 2001
 Air Uganda, a privately owned airline in Uganda from 2007 to 2014
 Uganda Air Cargo, a passenger and cargo airline based in Kampala, Uganda
 , a WWII British light cruiser
 , several ships
 , a British passenger ship
 Uganda Railway, a former British state-owned railway company
 Uganda Railways Corporation, parastatal railway of Uganda since 1977

Ugandan
 Ugandans, the population of Uganda
 Culture of Uganda, a diverse range of ethnic groups in Uganda
 Ugandan cuisine, traditional and modern cooking styles, practices, foods and dishes in Uganda

Other uses
 Miss Uganda, a national beauty pageant in Uganda
 Mr. Uganda, a pro-wrestler
 Uganda Museum, ethnological museum in Kampala, Uganda

See also
 
 
 Bishop of Uganda, a position in the Anglican diocese of Namirembe
 Church of Uganda, an Anglican sect
 Ugandan shilling, the currency of Uganda
 Ugandan English, the variety of English spoken in Uganda